Issues 101 is a gay-themed independent romantic drama film released in 2002. Issues 101 played at gay and lesbian film festivals throughout 2002 and 2003. This film was the debut of pop rock singer Grammy-winner Kelly Clarkson as an actress.

Synopsis 
Joe comes out and goes to a Southern Californian college. He begins to mix with the students and the Greek fraternal community. He finds himself one-third of a love triangle with two other guys, one gay and the other "straight with issues." This relationship is put to the test, when he decides to run for student body president.

Cast
 Michael Rozman as Joe Phillips
 Dennis W. Rittenhouse Jr. as Christian
 Jeff Sublett as Michael
 Jason Boegh as Steve Radberry
 Yolanda Johnston as Kim
 Jeremy Smith as Todd
 Gary Castro Churchwell as Bill (fraternity president)
 Trevor Murphy as Tim
 Kelly Clarkson as Crystal
 Larissa Kern as Lisa Lindbert
 Chris Benson as Justin
 Brian Swinehart as Bo
 Dan Callaway as Jeff
 Michael Haboush as Nick
 Brad Murphy as Scott- Pi Pi Rho pres

Controversy
The film attracted a formal complaint by a viewer to the New Zealand Broadcast Standards Authority after it aired during the Triangle Television gay television festival in Auckland in January 2003. The BSA on June 5, 2003, ruled that the scenes depicting oral and anal sex were offensive and the timeslot of its broadcast (8.30 pm) was unsuitable for children.

Home media
Issues 101 was released on Region 1 DVD on April 13, 2004.

Reception
Jay Nixon on behalf of 'Super Reviewer' gave the film a score ½ and said "Bad acting and rock bottom production values".

References

External links 
 [official website|http://issues101.com/ Issues 101]
 [IMDb title|0339209]

2002 films
American LGBT-related films
2002 romantic drama films
American romantic drama films
2000s English-language films
2000s American films